Acanalonia conica is a species of acanaloniid planthopper in the family Acanaloniidae. It is found in North America and Europe.

References

External links

 

Auchenorrhyncha
Insects described in 1830